Tinjan is a small village in the City Municipality of Koper in the Littoral region of Slovenia.

The parish church in the settlement is dedicated to Saint Michael.

References

External links
Tinjan on Geopedia

Populated places in the City Municipality of Koper
Transmitter sites in Slovenia